Jambaldoo Lhagva (born 10 September 1944) is a Mongolian chess player who holds the FIDE titles of FIDE Master (FM) and International Arbiter (IA). He is a six-time Mongolian Chess Championship winner (1974, 1976, 1977, 1990, 1992, 1997).

Biography
From the 1960s to the 1990s, Lhagva was one of leading Mongolian chess players. He won the Mongolian Chess Championship six times: 1974, 1976, 1977, 1990, 1992, and 1997. He participated in a number of international chess tournaments.

He played for Mongolia in the Chess Olympiads:
 In 1968, at the third board in the 18th Chess Olympiad in Lugano (+4, =5, -6),
 In 1970, at the third board in the 19th Chess Olympiad in Siegen (+9, =5, -5),
 In 1974, at the first board in the 21st Chess Olympiad in Nice (+8, =6, -6),
 In 1980, at the fourth board in the 24th Chess Olympiad in La Valletta (+3, =5, -6),
 In 1982, at the fourth board in the 25th Chess Olympiad in Lucerne (+9, =0, -5),
 In 1990, at the first reserve board in the 29th Chess Olympiad in Novi Sad (+4, =3, -3),
 In 1992, at the fourth board in the 30th Chess Olympiad in Manila (+3, =0, -3).

Lhagva is a graduate of the chess department at the Russian State University of Physical Education, Sport, Youth and Tourism.

References

External links
 
 
 

1944 births
Living people
Mongolian chess players
Chess FIDE Masters
Chess arbiters
Chess Olympiad competitors
Russian State University of Physical Education, Sport, Youth and Tourism, Department of Chess alumni
20th-century chess players